Matej Hočevar (born Ljubljana, 30 April 1982) is a Slovenian professional ice hockey player currently with HDD Olimpija Ljubljana of the Austrian Hockey League (EBEL). He participated at the 2011 IIHF World Championship as a member of the Slovenia men's national ice hockey team.

References

External links

 Profile at SiOL portal

1982 births
Living people
Slovenian ice hockey forwards
HDD Olimpija Ljubljana players
Sportspeople from Ljubljana
HK Slavija Ljubljana players
HK Olimpija players
Slovenian expatriate ice hockey people
Slovenian ice hockey coaches
Slovenian expatriate sportspeople in Italy
Slovenian expatriate sportspeople in Austria